Henry Bate may refer to:

 Henry Bate of Mechelen (1246–after 1310), Flemish philosopher, theologian, astronomer, astrologer, poet, and musician
 Henry Bate (politician) (1881–1967), Australian politician
 Henry Newell Bate (1828–1917), Canadian industrialist

See also
Sir Henry Bate Dudley (1745–1824), British minister